Cadbury's Chocolate Factory (also known as Cadbury's Claremont and colloquially as Cadbury's) is the largest chocolate factory in the Southern Hemisphere, producing a company-record of over  of chocolate in 2021.
Established at Claremont, Tasmania in 1921, the factory and surrounding model village estate marked Cadbury's first business expansion outside the United Kingdom. Cadbury's Claremont is currently owned by the multinational conglomerate Mondelēz International, which purchased Cadbury in 2010.

History

Following Cadbury's successful 1919 merger with rival chocolatiers Fry's, the British company decided to expand operations overseas. As Australia was one of the company's largest export markets, it was decided to be an appropriate location for their first factory abroad. After visiting Tasmania in January 1920, executives from Cadbury's selected the unique  peninsula location at Claremont due to the state's cheap provision of hydro electricity by the Hydro Electric Commission, cool climate and the availability of high-quality fresh dairy production and supply.
The Cadbury family were Quakers, and the company executives believed the site at Claremont embodied the Quaker values of the company, offering a tranquil and picturesque setting for workers.

Factory construction
Commencing construction in 1920, the factory was built entirely of white ferro-concrete. These included ancillary buildings for the warehouse and power and transformer houses, which were interconnected by covered arches on each floor.
Forty workers (consisting of twenty-four men and sixteen women) from the original Cadbury factory in Birmingham and Bristol in the United Kingdom relocated to Tasmania to oversee the factory construction and train newly recruited staff.
Cadbury's Chocolate Factory at Claremont was officially opened on 21 October 1921. Between March and May 1922, Cadbury's Managing Director Dorothy Cadbury visited the factory, overseeing working conditions from both the perspective of the employee and employer. Her parents, Chairman of Directors Barrow Cadbury and Dame Geraldine Cadbury DBE, and sister Geraldine Mary Cadbury accompanied her on the visit.
Bound for Sydney, the first shipment left Cadbury's Claremont on Saturday 8 April 1922, containing Pascall confectionery. Dorothy and Barrow Cadbury returned to Claremont in 1930.

Cadbury's Estate

Based upon the model village of Cadbury's Bournville estate in Birmingham, the newly established 'Cadbury's Estate' embodied Quaker ideology, providing housing for workers, shops, sporting facilities, a school, a Friends meeting house and parkland, complete with purple benches.
To assist worker education and social welfare, a variety of organisations and social activities were created within the self-contained community including a youth club, girls’ club, cricket club, a floricultural society and a camera club called "Candied Camera".
Located north of the City of Glenorchy, the estate has views of kunanyi / Mount Wellington to the west and both the City of Clarence and Brighton local government area on the eastern shore.

Within the estate are various roads and buildings containing historical industry namesakes, such as Bournville Road, named after Cadbury's original worker's estate. MacRobertson’s Road pays tribute to MacRobertson's, the Australian company which created Cherry Ripe, Freddo Frog and Old Gold, acquired by Cadburys in 1967. Today, the Cadbury's Estate has a rich history with eighteen heritage-listed buildings located on the site, including the former Claremont Primary School.

Claremont School
Constructed at a cost of £A247, the first school at Claremont opened in July 1890. In 1922, land for a new school was purchased with a brick building constructed for £A1600. With frontage along Windermere Bay, the new Claremont School was completed on the Cadbury's Estate in 1924 to facilitate factory worker's children. In 1936, a second plot was acquired and a new building constructed at a cost of £A914. The school underwent two rounds of extensions in 1941, with the first wing costing £A2,070, and a second costing £A1,297. The school was closely tied to the Cadbury factory workers, including students planting eighteen trees alongside Cadbury Road leading to the factory in 1949.

As part of the City of Glenorchy's Building the Education Revolution plan in 2009, the Claremont Primary School (as it was then known) was set to close following the proposal of two new primary schools facilitating the area.
The school closed in 2013 under the pretence it was be developed into housing.
In 2015, a $79 million subdivision was put forward to develop the site.
In 2017 the school was victim to an arson attack, causing upward of $150,000 in damages and destroying one of the school's historic buildings.
The school was purchased by businessman Kai Yang in 2019. In 2021, a $200m development on the site called the Windermere Bay Precinct was proposed, featuring 315 apartments and townhouses, a childcare centre, local shops, a cafe, and a gym and pool within the parkland setting. Designed by Circa Morris-Nunn Architects, the remaining heritage-listed school building will be retained and used for community facilities.

Cadbury's station

The Cadbury's Estate was previously connected to the former North–South rail corridor via a dedicated spur line, terminating at Cadbury's station.
The station was operational by September 1921, with Tasman Limited operating 26 weekday services along the North–South corridor until its closure in 1974. The former rail corridor has since been repurposed into a cycle track.

Factory tours

Due to the factory's long history and the general appeal of chocolate, Cadbury's Claremont was a major Tasmanian tourism attraction, recording 150,000 visitors annually until its on-site visitor centre closed in 2015.

Original factory tour
From 1948, the factory conducted public tours of the facility, showcasing the manufacturing process, including the fermenting, drying, roasting, and separating of cocoa beans from their skins to create cocoa solids and cocoa butter. The tour also included an inspection of the factory's pure granite conching machines dating back to the 1950s, industrial machinery and wrapping process, ending with a taste-testing and the collection of free samples.
The tours were discontinued in 2008 due to health and safety regulations adopted by the company globally and replaced with a newly-built visitor centre at the site in 2010.

Visitor Centre closure
During the 2013 federal election campaign, then-opposition leader Tony Abbott offered a $16 million grant to develop and upgrade the visitor centre. Once the Abbott government came into power, the parent company Mondelēz stated that they had not met the criteria for the grant. In spite public outcry, the visitor centre was permanently closed on the 18 December 2015.

Production

Cadbury's Chocolate Factory primarily produces chocolate blocks including Dairy Milk, Marvellous Creations and Old Gold varieties, as well as classic confectionery products such as Caramello Koala and Freddo Frog.
In 2022, a network of 56 dairy farms in North-West region of Tasmania contributes  of milk to chocolate production, which is then processed at Cadbury's Burnie milk depot. The milk is then transported to Hobart in B-Double road tankers. Australian sugar is imported from Mackay, Queensland, with cocoa sourced and imported from Ghana.
Chocolate bars and seasonal products, such as Easter Eggs, as well as boxed chocolates (Roses, Favourites and Milk Tray) are produced at the Victorian Cadbury facilities at Ringwood and Scoresby.

Ethics and sustainability
In April 2009, Cadbury Australia announced its commitment to Dairy Milk chocolate blocks achieving fair trade certification by Easter 2010.
When Cadbury was purchased by Mondelēz International in 2010, the parent company was already devising its own internal sustainability programme, named Cocoa Life, which commenced in 2012. In 2016, Mondelēz International discontinued Cadbury Dairy Milk's Fairtrade certification in favour for the Cocoa Life program. Labelling citing Fairtrade International had partnered with Mondelēz International for the Cocoa Life program appeared on packaging, which also saw the removal of the International Fairtrade Certification Mark. 100% sustainable cocoa in Cadbury's Australian-made goods was achieved in 2021 due to the Cocoa Life programme.

In September 2022, Cadbury Australia announced that all future Dairy Milk varieties would be wrapped in 30% recycled soft plastic, replacing former single-use packaging.

Claremont staples

Australian market staples manufactured at Claremont include:

Chocolate blocks
 Baking chocolate varieties
 Break-away varieties
 Caramilk
 Dairy Milk varieties
 Dream
 Marvellous Creations varieties
 Old Gold varieties

Confectionary products
 Caramello Koala
 Dream
 Flake
 Freddo Frog
 Furry Friends
 Time Out
 Twirl
 Yowie varieties

Redundancies and cuts
Historically Cadbury's Claremont has been a major employer for the City of Glenorchy, employing 1,100 workers in 1960. The workforce has continually reduced through the ongoing advancement of manufacturing technology and automation. In 2015, 80 factory floor jobs were cut following a $75m upgrade by Mondelēz International, with a further 11 jobs cut from the closure of the visitor centre.
The workforce lost 40 workers in 2018 following a further $20m upgrade to machinery. In 2018, Cadbury's Claremont has a workforce of 450 people, in comparison to 2003, when it employed up to 850 people at peak times.

Sponsorships
Cadbury's Claremont instigated the inaugral Cadbury Marathon in 1983. The event celebrated its 40th year in 2023. Cadbury have sponsored the Tasmanian T20 franchise cricket team, the Hobart Hurricanes, since the 2018–19 Big Bash League season.

Access
Cadbury Road is accessible via Main Road, Box Hill Road and Bolton Street, Claremont. Metro Tasmania bus number 512 services Claremont and the Cadbury's Estate, which depart from the Hobart Bus Mall in the CBD.

See also
 Cadbury World
 Cadbury Ireland
 Cadbury chocolate factory, Toronto

Notes

References

Sources

Further reading

External links
Cadbury Australia
Cocoa Life
Mondelēz International Australia

Food and drink companies established in 1922
Companies based in Tasmania
Buildings and structures in Hobart
Cadbury
Tourist attractions in Tasmania
Australian companies established in 1922
Dairy buildings in Australia
Chocolate factories